Paul Conroy (born 22 May 1989) is an Irish Gaelic footballer and teacher who plays at senior level for the Galway county team. Conroy was captain of the All-Ireland winning Minor team in 2007 when they narrowly defeated Derry. Conroy made his Senior championship debut against Roscommon and scored finished the game with a tally of 0–6.

Conroy won an Galway Intermediate Club Championship with St James' in 2010 and followed that up with a Connacht title.

He played twice for Ireland against Australia in the 2013 International Rules Series.

Conroy was named as Galway captain for the 2014 season.

He is an Irish and business teacher at Coláiste Bhaile Chláir in Claregalway. His fellow teammate Damien Comer also teaches in the school. The Irish language has been an integral part of Conroy's life as his parents hail from the Connemara Gaeltacht. In March 2022, Conroy was announced as the GAA's Irish language ambassador for 2022 at an event in Croke Park.

Career statistics 

 As of match played 24 July 2022

Honours

St James'
Galway Minor Football Championships (2): 2006, 2007,
Galway Intermediate Football Championship (1): 2010
Connacht Intermediate Club Football Championship (1): 2010

Galway
Connacht Minor Football Championship (1): 2007
All-Ireland Minor Football Championship (1): 2007
Connacht Senior Football Championship (2): 2008, 2016, 2018
National Football League, Division 2 (1): 2017

References

1989 births
Living people
Galway inter-county Gaelic footballers
Irish international rules football players
Irish schoolteachers
St James' (Galway) Gaelic footballers